Neoprocolophon is an extinct genus of procolophonid parareptile, known from the single species Neoprocolophon asiaticus from the Middle Triassic of China. It was named by Chinese paleontologist Yang Zhongjian (better known as C. C. Young) in 1957 from the Ermaying Formation.

References

Leptopleuronines
Triassic parareptiles
Prehistoric animals of China
Taxa named by Yang Zhongjian
Prehistoric reptile genera